Dinamo Tbilisi's  third season in the Umaglesi Liga.

Squad report

Dinamo Tbilisi played by the name FC Iberia Tbilisi.

Current squad

Appearances, goals and disciplinary record

Competitions

Umaglesi Liga

League table

Matches

Georgian Cup

External links 
 Georgian cup competition calendar
 Archive of FC Dinamo Tbilisi matches by seasons

FC Dinamo Tbilisi seasons
Din